Eraldo Monzeglio (5 June 1906 – 3 November 1981) was an Italian association football coach and player, who played as a defender, in the position of full-back. Monzeglio had a highly successful career as a footballer, although he also later attracted controversy due to his close relationship with the Italian fascist dictator Benito Mussolini. At club level, he played for Casale, Bologna, and Roma, winning the Serie A title and two editions of the Mitropa Cup with Bologna. At international level, he also had success representing the Italy national football team, and was a member of the Italian teams that won consecutive FIFA World Cup titles in 1934 and 1938, being named to the tournament's All-star Team in 1934; he also won two editions of the Central European International Cup with Italy. Along with Giuseppe Meazza and Giovanni Ferrari, he is one of only three Italian players to have won two World Cups. Following his retirement as a player, he worked as a coach for Italian clubs Como, Pro Sesto, Napoli, Sampdoria, and Juventus, as well as Swiss club Chiasso. He was posthumously inducted into the Italian Football Hall of Fame in 2013.

Club career
Monzeglio was born in Vignale Monferrato, in the province of Alessandria (Piedmont).

In his nineteen-year career as a football defender, which lasted from 1924 to 1943, he played for Casale, Bologna, and Roma. With Bologna, he was victorious in the 1928–29 championship, also winning two Mitropa Cups in 1932 and 1934.

International career
At international level, Monzeglio played for the Italy national team on 35 occasions, which the team also won two FIFA World Cup finals, in 1934 and 1938, being named to the Team of the Tournament in 1934; he also won two Central European International Cups with Italy.

Coaching career
Despite his success and fame as a footballer, following the conclusion of the Second World War, however, Monzeglio had initially attracted controversy, due to his political views and close friendship with the Italian fascist dictator Benito Mussolini, as well as his role as Mussolini's personal coach. Monzeglio later became a coach, managing the Italian teams of A.S. Roma, Como, Pro Sesto, Napoli, Sampdoria, Juventus, and Lecco, as well as Chiasso, in Switzerland, between 1941 and 1973. Monzeglio died in Turin, on 3 November 1981, at the age of 75. In 2013, he was posthumously inducted into the Italian Football Hall of Fame.

Honours

Player

Club
Bologna
Serie A: 1928–29
Mitropa Cup: 1932, 1934

International
Italy
 FIFA World Cup: 1934, 1938
 Central European International Cup: 1927–30, 1933–35
 Central European International Cup: Runner-up: 1931-32

Manager
Napoli
Serie B: 1949–50

Individual
FIFA World Cup Team of the Tournament: 1934
Seminatore d'oro: 1959–60
Italian Football Hall of Fame: 2013 (Posthumous)

References

External links
Eraldo Monzeglio at Enciclopediadelcalcio.it

1906 births
1981 deaths
People from Vignale Monferrato
Italian footballers
Italy international footballers
Italian football managers
Bologna F.C. 1909 players
Casale F.B.C. players
A.S. Roma players
Serie A players
A.S. Roma managers
S.S.D. Pro Sesto managers
S.S.C. Napoli managers
U.C. Sampdoria managers
Juventus F.C. managers
Calcio Lecco 1912 managers
Serie A managers
1934 FIFA World Cup players
1938 FIFA World Cup players
FIFA World Cup-winning players
FC Chiasso managers
Expatriate football managers in Switzerland
Association football defenders
A.C. Monza managers
Sportspeople from the Province of Alessandria